Double Barrel Benefit (DBB), is WKNC-FM's annual fundraiser that provides for two nights of music from local North Carolina based bands. The benefit series was first organized by former General Manager Jamie Procter and held January 4–5, 2004 in Raleigh, North Carolina. The benefit changed locations for the first time in 2008, when the venue changed from Kings Barcade to The Pour House. The concert returned to the newly reopened Kings Barcade in 2011 and then returned to The Pour House in 2012. In 2014, the show split weekends and venues, holding the event at Lincoln Theatre in Raleigh and Cat's Cradle in Carrboro. The event returned to the same weekend and venue in 2017. There was no Double Barrel Benefit show held in 2021, due to the COVID-19 pandemic.

In 2011, each attendant to either night was given a CD of material from each artist that performed, with the exception of Inflowential, who had to cancel their appearance. The album featured new material from the acts, and the majority was recorded on the campus of North Carolina State University.

In 2016, during the second night of the 13th annual Double Barrel Benefit, Charlotte rapper, Baby Jesus — now known as DaBaby — had a surprise guest performance at the beginning of Deniro Farrar's set. 

In 2022, Double Barrel returned to The Pour House after Kings shutdown due to the COVID-19 pandemic.

References

Recurring events established in 2004